Elshan Abdullayev (born on 5 September 1993) is an Azerbaijani footballer who plays as a midfielder for Sabah in the Azerbaijan Premier League.

Club career
Abdullayev made his debut in the Azerbaijan Premier League for Neftçi Baku on 15 February 2012, match against Sumgayit.

Honours

Club
Neftçi
Azerbaijan Premier League (2): 2011–12, 2012–13
Azerbaijan Cup (2): 2012–13, 2013–14

Qarabağ
Azerbaijan Premier League (1): 2016–17
Azerbaijan Cup (1): 2016–17

International
Azerbaijan U23
 Islamic Solidarity Games: (1) 2017

References

External links
 

1994 births
Living people
Association football midfielders
Azerbaijani footballers
Azerbaijan youth international footballers
Azerbaijan under-21 international footballers
Azerbaijan Premier League players
Neftçi PFK players
Sumgayit FK players
Qarabağ FK players
Zira FK players
Sabah FC (Azerbaijan) players
People from Sumgait